Abu al-Abbas Ahmad Ibn Abd as-Salam al-Jarawi (1133-1212) was the official poet of the Almohad dynasty. He published his poems in a diwan. Ibn Idhari quotes 300 lines by Al-Jarawi in his Al-Bayan al-Mughrib. Little is known of him, except that he came from the Zenata tribe.

Notes and references

H. Shabihi Husni, Abu al-'Abbas al-Jarawi:528-609 h. 1133-1212 m, 1986.

Almohad poets
1133 births
1212 deaths
12th-century Moroccan people
12th-century Berber people
People from Marrakesh
13th-century Berber people
Berber writers
Berber poets
13th-century Moroccan poets